Joseph Richards may refer to:
 Joseph Richards (rugby) (1868–?), rugby union footballer of the 1890s
 Joseph Richards (politician), representative to the Massachusetts Great and General Court
 Sir Joseph Richards, 3rd baronet (died 1738) of the Richards baronets
 Joseph John Richards (1878–1956), composer, conductor and music educator
 J. Havens Richards (1851–1923), Roman Catholic priest
 Joseph Loscombe Richards (1798–1854), Oxford college head

See also
Joe Richards (disambiguation)
Joseph Richard (disambiguation)